Welborn-Ross House is a historic home located at Princeton, Gibson County, Indiana.  It was built between 1875 and 1881, and is a -story, Italianate style brick dwelling with a rear wing. It has an asymmetrical cross-plan and features an ornate one-story, full-width front porch.  It was built by Dr. William P. Welborn, a prominent local physician.

It was listed on the National Register of Historic Places in 1978.

References

Houses on the National Register of Historic Places in Indiana
Italianate architecture in Indiana
Houses completed in 1881
Buildings and structures in Gibson County, Indiana
National Register of Historic Places in Gibson County, Indiana
1881 establishments in Indiana